Epi Taione (born 2 March 1979) is a former Tongan rugby union footballer whose last club was London Welsh. He normally played at centre but could cover the wing or back row.

Rugby career
He started his professional career at Newcastle Falcons. In the summer of 2005, he joined Sale Sharks on a two-year contract. However, his contract was cancelled when he was banned for 18 weeks for biting Denis Leamy in a Heineken Cup game against Munster. In the 2005–2006 season, Taione made 5 appearances before his contract was terminated, and Sale Sharks won their first ever Premiership title. After his ban he went to Japan to play for the Sanyo Wild Knights.

Taione controversially changed his name to Paddy Power for the duration of the 2007 Rugby World Cup in a sponsorship deal agreed with the Irish bookmaker. the sponsorship deal financed the Tongan preparation for the World Cup. The Tongans nearly beat the eventual winner, South Africa, and lost narrowly to the other finalist, England.

His next move was to Harlequins, but he received little playing time and so moved on to the French side Racing Métro 92 in 2009. In 2010, he joined London Welsh.

He played for Tonga at the 1999 and 2007 Rugby World Cups. He also played for the Pacific Islanders.

Taione was forced to retire in December 2011 due to a serious knee injury.

In 2009, Taione had a small non-speaking role as a member of the New Zealand Rugby team in the film Invictus.

He is a founder member of APBs aka The Brothers, an invitational club that is instrumental in developing the game in the Asia and Pacific regions. He is involved in a few business ventures around the world including clubs and bars in London. He's a board member of the Tongan Rugby Union.

References

External links

Tongan rugby union players
1979 births
Living people
Newcastle Falcons players
Sale Sharks players
Harlequin F.C. players
Expatriate rugby union players in Japan
Tongan actors
Tonga international rugby union players
Pacific Islanders rugby union players
Racing 92 players
London Welsh RFC players
Sharks (rugby union) players
Tongan expatriate rugby union players
Expatriate rugby union players in England
Expatriate rugby union players in France
Tongan expatriate sportspeople in France
Tongan expatriate sportspeople in Japan
Tongan expatriate sportspeople in England
Rugby union centres